Georgetown is the capital and largest city of Guyana. It is situated in Demerara-Mahaica, region 4, on the Atlantic Ocean coast, at the mouth of the Demerara River. It is nicknamed the "Garden City of the Caribbean." It is the retail, administrative, and financial services centre of the country, and the city accounts for a large portion of Guyana's GDP. The city recorded a population of 118,363 in the 2012 census. 

All executive departments of Guyana's government are located in the city, including Parliament Building, Guyana's Legislative Building and the Court of Appeals, Guyana's highest judicial court. The State House (the official residence of the head of state), as well as the offices and residence of the head of government, are both located in the city. The CARICOM headquarters is also based in Georgetown. 

Georgetown is also known for its British colonial architecture, including the tall painted-timber St. George's Cathedral and the iconic Stabroek Market.

History 
The city of Georgetown began as a small town in the 18th century. Originally, the capital of the Demerara-Essequibo colony was located on Borsselen Island in the Demerara River under the administration of the Dutch. When the colony was captured by the British in 1781, Lieutenant-Colonel Robert Kingston chose the mouth of the Demerara River for the establishment of a town which was situated between Plantations Werk-en-rust and Vlissengen.

It was the French who made it a capital city when they colonised it in 1782. The French called the capital Longchamps. When the town was restored to the Dutch in 1784, it was renamed Stabroek after Nicolaas Geelvinck, Lord of Stabroek, and president of the Dutch West India Company. Eventually the town expanded and covered the estates of Vlissengen, La Bourgade and Eve Leary to the North, and Werk-en-rust and La Repentir to the South.

It was renamed Georgetown on 29 April 1812 in honour of King George III. On 5 May 1812, an ordinance was passed to the effect that the town formerly called Stabroek, with districts extending from La Penitence to the bridges in Kingston and entering upon the road to the military camps, shall be called Georgetown.

The ordinance provided that the various districts of Georgetown shall be known by their own names. The supervision of Georgetown was to be done by a committee chosen by the governor and Court of Policy. Estimates of expenditure were to be prepared.

By 1806, the owner of Vlissingen asked to be exempted from the responsibility of maintaining the road which is now called Camp Street, but the Court refused the request. In 1810, the maintenance of the roads in the area called Georgetown cost 11,000 guilders per annum.

The governing body of Georgetown was once a Board of Police. The Board of Police was chosen by the governor and the Court of Policy. It came into existence as the result of disputes among various organisations which controlled the districts. The board met monthly but what was discussed is not on the records between 1825 and 1837. Newspapers in the colony were prohibited by law from reporting public matters.

The post of Commissary of Police was not regarded as important. People elected to the board invariably declined to attend meetings and never gave reasons for their refusal. It was, therefore, decided that individuals elected to the board were bound to serve for two years, or suffer a penalty of 1,000 guilders. The Board of Police was abolished when an ordinance was passed to establish a mayor and town council.

Georgetown gained official city status on 24 August 1842 during the reign of Queen Victoria.

The names of Georgetown's wards and streets reflect the influence of the Dutch, French and English who administered the town at different periods of history.

Cummingsburg was originally named Plantation La Bourgade by its first owner, Jacques Salignac. It was laid out in streets and building lots by its second proprietor, Thomas Cuming, a Scotsman, from whom it gets its current name. He made a presentation of the Militia Parade Ground and Promenade Gardens to the town as a gift. Carmichael Street was named after General Hugh Lyle Carmichael who served as governor from 1812 to 1813. He died in March 1813 and was buried in the Officers' Cemetery, Eve Leary.

Water Street was so called because it ran along the riverside and formed the original river dam. High Street formed the leading road from the East Bank to the East Coast of Demerara. The part of High Street that ran through Cummingsburg was called Main Street. Camp Street received its name because it was the road which led to the camp or garrison at the northern end of the city. Kingston got its name from King George of Great Britain. It was part of Pln. Eve Leary which was named after the wife or daughter of its owner, Cornelis Leary. Some of the streets of Kingston have military names because the garrison used to be located there, e.g. Parade Street, Barrack Street and Fort Street.

Lacytown was another leasehold portion of Plantation Vlissengen. Luke M. Hill*states that it was named after the lessee, George Lacy, who was related to the family of General Sir De Lacy Evans (sic. - General Sir George de Lacy Evans GCB), a Crimean war hero. The owner of Vlissengen was Joseph Bourda, Member of the Court of Policy. After his son and heir disappeared at sea, the government claimed the property under the authority of the Vlissengen Ordinance of 1876. A new district of Bourda was laid out and Lacytown was improved by the Board of Vlissengen Commissioners.

Bourda Street and the ward of Bourda were named after Joseph Bourda, Member of the Court of Policy and former owner of Pln. Vlissengen. It was laid out by the Commissioner of Vlissengen in 1879. The Bourda Cemetery holds the remains of many citizens of Georgetown. Only those persons who owned family vaults or burial rights in the enclosed ground used it.

In 1945, a large fire (The Great Fire) broke out in the city, causing widespread damage.

Geography 

Georgetown is located on Guyana's Atlantic coast on the east bank of Demerara River estuary. The terrain in this part of the country where the city is located is flat coastal plains. The city is surrounded by a blanket of cane fields along with marshy swamps, and savannah lands on its east and south. The elevation of the land is one metre below the high tide level. This low elevation is protected by a retaining wall known as the seawall to keep the ocean out and an innovative network of canals with kokers to drain the city of excess water.

Climate 
Georgetown has a year-round hot trade-wind tropical rainforest climate (Af). Relative humidity fluctuates throughout the year with the highest occurring in May, June, August and December–January; these months are usually the rainiest part of the year. Between the months of September to November relative humidity is lower ushering in the drier season.

Georgetown does not truly have a dry season – monthly precipitation in all 12 months is above . Because of its location Georgetown's temperatures are moderated by the North-East trade winds blowing in from the North Atlantic and so it rarely sees temperatures above 31 degrees Celsius.

Transportation

Air 
The Cheddi Jagan International Airport (formerly Timehri Airport) acts as the major air transportation hub for the city, which is located on the right bank of the Demerara River, 41 kilometres south of Georgetown. Closer to the city is Ogle Airport, with a terminal facility geared to handle regional, international and inter-Caricom flights, connecting CARICOM states with the CARICOM Secretariat. Helicopters also use this airport for the support of offshore oil and gas exploration activities.

Land 
The four-lane East Coast Highway was completed in 2005.

Georgetown is served by private buses. There is a regular coach service between Georgetown and Boa Vista in Brazil. The Demerara Harbour Bridge is a major crossing point. Taxi service is available almost everywhere along the coast including in large numbers in Georgetown.

Water 
Georgetown also is home to a seaport. The Demerara River is navigable by oceangoing vessels up to roughly 100 km upriver.

Demographics
Georgetown recorded a population of 118,363 in the 2012 Guyanese census, down 12 percent from the 134,497 people counted in the 2002 census. In 2002, about 70,962 (53%) listed themselves as Black/African; 31,902 (24%) as mixed; 26,542 (20%) as East Indian; 1,441 (1.1%) as Amerindian; 1,075 (0.8%) as Portuguese; 475 (0.35%) as Chinese; 2,265 (1.7%) as "don't know/not stated"; 196 (0.15%) as white not of Portuguese descent; 35 as "other".

Points of interest

A long seawall helps prevent flooding. The city has numerous boulevards and contains many wooden colonial buildings and markets.

Most of the main buildings are centred around the western region of the town. Around the western-central area is Independence Square and Promenade Gardens, the Walter Roth Museum of Anthropology, the National Library (built by Andrew Carnegie), the Bank of Guyana, Company Path Garden, the National Museum of Guyana and State House (built 1852) where the president resides, St. George's Anglican Cathedral and the Red House. 

The Georgetown Cenotaph, at Main and Church Streets, was built in 1923. It is the site of Remembrance Day (Remembrance Sunday) services in November each year.

To the south of this region is where the neo-Gothic City Hall (1889) is to be found, as well as the Victoria Law Courts (1887), the Parliament Building (1829–1834), the large Stabroek Market (1792) containing the prominent cast-iron clock tower that dominates the city sky line, the Roman Catholic Brickdam Cathedral, City Engineer House, the Magistrate's Court, St. Andrew's Kirk (1818) and Independence Arch.

The northern area of the city near the Atlantic coast contains Splashmins Fun Park, Fort William Frederick, a park and the Umana Yana, a conical thatched building built by Wai-Wai Amerindians using traditional techniques. It was built for the 1972 Non-Aligned Foreign Ministers Conference. The Umana Yana burnt down in 2010 but was rebuilt in 2016. The Georgetown Lighthouse is a famous landmark.

The Guyana National Park is an urban park in the city. More inland, surrounded by residential neighbourhoods are the Guyana Zoo, Botanical Gardens and Castellani House. The city's suburbs are also home to the Museum of African Heritage located in Bel Air Park.

Sports 
Georgetown hosted the CaribeBasket, the top international basketball tournament for countries in the Caribbean in 1981, 1988 and 1994.

Performing arts

Georgetown's theatre scene is dominantly concentrated on the stages of the National Cultural Centre. Plays are also staged at the theatre guild of Guyana. This is the oldest theatrical performance facility in Guyana. It was opened in 1957 and restored in 2007.

Neighbourhoods

Central Georgetown 
The central city includes the Business district as well as the seat of the national Government.

Greater Georgetown 
Northeastern Georgetown also has many significant business headquarters, such as for University of Guyana, Guyana Sugar Corporation, and the CARICOM Secretariat. Also here are The Cyril Potter College of Education, Guyana International Conference Centre, and Eugene F. Correira International Airport.

This area also has a number of exclusive gated communities. Bel Air Park, Bel Air Gardens, Lamaha Gardens and Bel Air Springs are well known ultimately as places for the rich and powerful. 

North of Georgetown lies Main Street, where the head of state's official residence as well as the Ministry of Finance. East of Georgetown stretches towards the Avenue of the Republic, where Georgetown's city hall building is located, and St. George's Cathedral. Also on the east side is Brickdam, which is the single most concentrated area of executive departments and agencies. The Ministries of Health, Education, Home Affairs, Housing and Water are all located on Brickdam.

West of Stabroek Market is the Port of Georgetown, the largest and busiest shipping point in Guyana. Stabroek Market itself contains the Ministry of Labour as well as the Ministry of Human Services and Social Security. It is also the host facility for the equally famous Stabroek markets. Regent Street is considered Georgetown's premier shopping district and Sheriff Street is the main entertainment area containing most of the city's clubs, bars and restaurants.

South Georgetown 
The south end incorporates communities of neighbourhoods along the eastern bank of the Demerara River such as Sophia, Roxanne Burnham Gardens, Albouystown, and Agricola. Those are well known and highly regarded poor areas of the city. Some areas such as Houston Estates, Ruimvelt and Thirst Park have retained high levels of affluence.

Crime 
Armed robberies occur regularly in Georgetown, especially in businesses and shopping districts. Particularly high crime areas of Georgetown include Tiger Bay, Albouystown, Sophia, all of south Georgetown, Buxton and Agricola. Robberies are a daily occurrence in the Stabroek Market area. A number of assaults have taken place in the botanical garden.

Utilities
Power is supplied by the state-owned and controlled Guyana Power and Light. Water supply and sanitation in Guyana is handled by state-owned Guyana Water Incorporated.

Notable people
John Agard, a poet born in Georgetown
Joy Ford Austin, non-profit executive and philanthropist, born in Georgetown
Julian Austin (1949), Olympic field-hockey player
Sudesh Fitzgerald, professional darts player, born in Georgetown
Lance Gibbs (born 1934), former member of the West Indies cricket team
David A. Granger (born 1945), former President of Guyana 
R. B. Greaves, an American singer born in Georgetown
Saint Jhn, born Carlos St. John Phillips, American-born singer and rapper, raised between Brooklyn and Georgetown
Wilson Harris, Guyanese writer
Roger Harper (born 1963), former member of the West Indies cricket team
Carl Hooper (born 1966), former member of the West Indies cricket team
Donald Kayum (born 1955), cricketer
Clive Lloyd (born 1944), captain West Indies cricket team
Thomas Moulder (1872–1920), cricketer
Manzoor Nadir, former minister and current Speaker of the National Assembly
Grace Nichols (born 1950) Guyanese poet
C. C. H. Pounder, a Guyanese-American actress, born in Georgetown
Walter Rodney, historian of Africa, born in Georgetown
John Rodriguez, former Canadian MP and Mayor of Sudbury
Neville Stanton, Guyanese footballer
Dušan Velkaverh, Slovenian lyricist, born in Georgetown
Oscar Weber (1871–1946), cricketer
Oneeka Williams (born 1966), Guyanese writer and surgeon
Letitia Wright, a Guyanese actress, born in Georgetown

Twin towns – sister cities
Georgetown has several sister cities, as designated by Sister Cities International:
 – St. Louis, Missouri, United States
 – Port of Spain, Trinidad and Tobago

References

External links

 
Capitals in South America
Populated places in Demerara-Mahaica
History of Guyana
Port cities in South America
Populated places established in the 18th century
18th-century establishments in South America
1781 establishments in the British Empire